Paulo Jamur (born 17 December 1964) is a Brazilian former cyclist. He competed at the 1984 Summer Olympics and the 1988 Summer Olympics.

References

External links
 

1964 births
Living people
Brazilian male cyclists
Brazilian track cyclists
Olympic cyclists of Brazil
Cyclists at the 1984 Summer Olympics
Cyclists at the 1988 Summer Olympics
Place of birth missing (living people)
Pan American Games medalists in cycling
Pan American Games bronze medalists for Brazil
Medalists at the 1987 Pan American Games